Combretum indicum, also known as the Rangoon creeper, is a vine with red flower clusters which is native to tropical Asia.

Description
The Rangoon creeper is a ligneous vine that can reach from 2.5 meters to up to 8 meters. The leaves are elliptical with an acuminate tip and a rounded base. They grow from 7 to 15 centimeters and their arrangement is opposite. The flowers are fragrant and tubular and their color varies from white to pink to red. The 30 to 35 mm long fruit is ellipsoidal and has five prominent wings. The fruit tastes like almonds when mature.

Rangoon creeper is found in thickets or secondary forests of the Philippines, India, Pakistan  and Malaysia. It has since been cultivated and naturalized in tropical areas such as Bangladesh, Burma, Vietnam, and Thailand.

The flowers change in colour with age and it is thought that this is a strategy to gather more pollinators. The flower is initially white and opens at dusk. This attracts hawkmoths with long tongues for pollination. On the second day it turns pink and on the third it turns red attracting day flying bees and birds. The flower also changes from a horizontal orientation to a drooping pose.

Potential toxicity
The seeds of this and related species, Quisqualis fructus and Q. chinensis, contain the chemical quisqualic acid, which is an agonist for the AMPA receptor, a kind of glutamate receptor in the brain. The chemical is linked to excitotoxicity (cell death). The seeds have been used for treating roundworm and pinworm. It is toxic to the parasite and kills it in the digestive tract.

History
Dr John Ivor Murray sent a sample of the "nuts" to the Museum of Economic Botany in Edinburgh in 1861, with a note that they were "used by the Chinese for worms" and a description of the means of preparation and dosage.

Gallery

References

External links 
 Quisqualis indica L.
 Quisqualis indica (PIER species info)

 

indicum
Flora of tropical Asia